Arocha is a genus of spiders in the family Mimetidae. It was first described in 1893 by Simon. , it contains 2 species found in Peru and Brazil.

References

Mimetidae
Araneomorphae genera
Spiders of South America